Mike Bennett (born 1962Cheltenham, England) is a British writer and record producer.  His first involvement with the music industry came when he was asked to write and produce Toyah Wilcox's Dreamchild and "Out of the Blue", which was released on Cryptic Records, and featured collaborations,

Career

Early years
Bennett has been writing since he was sixteen years old and received his first commission for the BBC at 17 from producer Ted Beston. During this period, he wrote for Playground (BBC Radio 1 & BBC Radio 2) and Show (Radio 1). He also wrote and co-starred in the children’s series Bill Wonder, Maggie Philbin (Radio 2).

1980s and 1990s

He subsequently went on to co-write and produce Hazel O'Connor's album Ignite (Universal), as well as co-writing Hidden for Hazel O'Connor and Clannad's Moya Brennan. Throughout the 1980s and 1990s Bennett continued to produce an artists including Bad Manners, Hazell Dean, Diane Charlemagne, [[Glen [[Doctor and the Medic "All of the Day and All of the Night" and "European Female".

Bennett also co-wrote and produced with Kim Fowley. These sessions culminated in the albums around this period included Let the Madness In (Receiver Records) and Trip of a Lifetime (Universal),  the latter featuredWilliam Orbit and Teenage Fanclub. He went on to produce Kim Fowley and the BMX Bandits (band) Receiver Records' album Hidden Agenda At the Thirteenth Not. Bennett also co-wrote and produced tracks with Fowley for the BMX Bandits’ album Theme Park (Creation Records).

He went on to produce and co-write several albums for The Fall, which started with the Permanent/BMG which was followed an animal for which he was a co-writer. Bennett went on to produce several more albums with The Fall including The Light User Syndrome (Jet Records).

Bennett went on to produce an slum for Wishbone Ash, including Timeline (Universal), Live in Japan (Action Replay) as well as co-writing and producing Trance Visionary (BMG) and Psychic Terrorism

Whilst working as an in house producer Bennett produced and remixed several artists including The Specials - for whom he remixed "Too Much Too Young", "Gangsters" and "Concrete Jungle", The Selecter, Dennis Brown, [[The Pioneers (band) Desmond Dekker, collaborated with on with the dubplate of Bionic Rats which first featured on the Trojan Jungle series. Bennett also remixed several Bob Marley and the Wailers tracks including "Soul Shakedown Party" and "Mr. Brown" which were featured on the Bob Marley compilation Behind the Legend.

Other remixes during this period include "Too Much Too Young" (EP) by The Specials, "A Train to Skaville" by The Selecter, Bennett's obsession with beats, pulses and street rhythms was soon to take him into the ever experimental world of drum’n’bass. This resulted in a prolific period where Bennett and his newly formed team of DJs produced 27 consecutive albums. Including massive sellers such as Drum’n’Bass Mania (Demon), Drum’n’Bass Frenzy (Demon), The Jungle Collection (QED), Drum’n’Bass Invasion (Universal) and Junglist Jazz Collection (Intrinsic/Pinnacle).

In of celebration of Bennett produced the memorial tribute album The Day World Turned Day-Glo including Jona Lewie's, "You'll Always Find Me in the Kitchen at Parties", as well as producing The Verve producer Youth (musician and producer), Bennett also produced Doctor and the Medics' "Livewire EP", which features their hit, "Spirit in the Sky".

Bennett has recently been working on the track, "When You're Down" by (Lazy Stars) featuring Daryl Hannah. He has written a track "Halo - Stemz" featuring various members of The Fall,Gorillaz, [[The Specials 

He also co-wrote "Firefly" by Freak Party which was with Johnny Marr and The Smiths along with original drummer Simon Wolstencroft - which was restored from a recording found by Wolstencroft in an old flight case after 34 years - which was released on Funky Si records via Universal and featured House legend Angie Brown on lead vocals.

Bennett has recently co-written and produced the single "Move On by Stella Grundy" of Intastella and for Northern Quarter records and is in the process of producing the Grundy The Rise and Fall of a Northern DubStar. He has remixed Dillinger's "5 Man Army" which is available via Nova distribution.

He went on to work for producer Mike Jackson as scriptwriter in residence at Children’s ITV. During this three-year period he wrote for many noted TV presenters and celebrities, including Bernard Bresslaw, and He also wrote and devised Children’s ITV Summer Mornings, presented by Mark Granger and produced by Mike Jackson, and was a writer on Primary Science, Fun Factory (ITV), Young London

Playwright
Bennett went on to work as a playwright at the Mermaid Theatre, where he wrote Safety In Numbers and It's All In The Stars, the latter with astronomer Nigel Henbest. Both these children’s plays made national tours, as well as running in the west end at The Mermaid Theatre,and The Arts Theatre. He also wrote for the famous Unicorn Theatre Company. His other west end credits include the critically acclaimed musical All Cloned Up, (Westminster Theatre), for which (Players Theatre).

He has written and co-written many plays and farces which have been seen at theatres such as Crucible Theatre in Sheffield, Harlow Playhouse, [[Grand Metropole Hotel Derby Playhouse, and the Edinburgh Playhouse. He also wrote the acclaimed play about Mari Lloyd called The Good Old Daze, presented at The Wimbledon Theatre. Artists appearing in his plays such as Seaside Romp, Hands off My Crumpet, Adventures of Alice, and Happy Families, included Bob Grant, Mollie Sugden, and Jack Douglas.

Bennett has also written and scripted for many well known comedians and performers, such as Jim Bowen, and Anita Harris for whom he wrote and directed four talking book. One Media iP Group Plc. He wrote and directed six children's books and animation as well as a six part radio

References

External links
 
 * 

1962 births
Living people
British record producers
British writers
People from Cheltenham